Siberian Tatar language — себертатар теле, көнбатыш себер татарлары теле — is a Turkic language spoken in Western Siberia region of Russia, primarily in the oblasts of Tyumen, Novosibirsk, Omsk but also in Tomsk and Kemerovo.

Dialects
Siberian Tatar consists of three dialects: Tobol-Irtysh, Baraba and Tom. According to D. G. Tumasheva, the Baraba dialect is grammatically closest to the southern dialect of Altai, Kyrgyz and has significant grammatical similarities with Chulym, Khakas, Shor, and Tuvan. The Tomsk dialect is, in her opinion, even closer to Altai and similar languages. The Tevriz sub-dialect of the Tobol-Irtysh dialect shares significant elements with the Siberian Turkic languages, namely with Altai, Khakas and Shor.

Although Gabdulkhay Akhatov was a Volga Tatar, he immersed into studying of the phonetic peculiarities of Siberian Tatar language of the indigenous population of Siberia, the Siberian Tatars. In his work "The Dialect of the West Siberian Tatars" (1963)  Akhatov wrote about Tobol-Irtysh Siberian Tatars, a western group of Siberian Tatars, who are indigenous to the Omsk and Tyumen Oblasts.

In his work "Dialect of the West Siberian Tatars" (1963) Gabdulkhay Akhatov wrote about a territorial resettlement of the Tobol-Irtysh Tatars Tyumen and Omsk areas. Subjecting a comprehensive integrated analysis of the phonetic system, the lexical composition and grammatical structure, the scientist concluded that the language of the Siberian Tatars is a separate language, it is divided into three dialects and it is one of the most ancient Turkic languages. Professor G. Akhatov named Siberian Tatar dialects of Tyumen and Omsk Oblasts dialects of the West Siberian Tatars, while dialects of Baraba and Tom Tatars he named dialects of the East Siberian Tatars.

Some works further differentiate sub-dialects of three aforementioned dialects, breaking them down as follows:

 Tobol-Irtysh dialect
 Tyumen sub-dialect (Tyumensky District, Yalutorovsky District, and Nizhnetavdinsky District of Tyumen Oblast)
 Tobol sub-dialect (Tobolsky District, Vagaysky District, Yarkovsky District of Tyumen Oblast)
 Western Tobol variety (Vagaysky District)
 Zabolotny sub-dialect (Tobolsky District and Nizhnetavdinsky District of Tyumen Oblast)
 Tevriz sub-dialect (Tevrizsky District, Ust-Ishimsky District, Znamensky District of Omsk Oblast, plus some settlements in Tyumen Oblast's Vagaysky District)
 Tara sub-dialect (Tarsky District, Bolsherechensky District, Kolosovsky District of Omsk Oblast)
 Baraba dialect
 Tom dialect
 Eushtino-Chatsk (Tomsky District, Tomsk Oblast)
 Orsk (Kolyvansky District, Novosibirsk Oblast)
 Kalmak (Yurginsky District, Kemerovo Oblast)

Some sources consider Kalmak to be a separate variety, or even a dialect of the Teleut language, as it differs greatly from other Siberian Tatar varieties.

Alphabet
Currently, there is no regulatory document that would legislate the writing of the Siberian Tatar language. This circumstance prevents an unambiguous interpretation of the existence of the Siberian Tatar language as the generally accepted literary language of the Tatars of Western Siberia in Russia, so in this situation we can only talk about a particularly isolated, independent West Siberian dialect of the Tatar language with signs of an independent language.

Phonology

Vowels

Consonants 

/ŋ/ can be an allophone of /ɴ/.

References

Bibliography

External links

Information about Siberian Tatar language

Agglutinative languages
Definitely endangered languages
Siberian Tatars
Turkic languages